Eremo di San Giovanni all'Orfento (Italian for Hermitage of Giovanni all'Orfento) is an hermitage located in Caramanico Terme, Province of Pescara (Abruzzo, Italy).

History

Architecture

References

External links
 

Giovanni all'Orfento
Caramanico Terme